Placoeme is a genus of beetles in the family Cerambycidae, containing the following species:

 Placoeme vitticollis Chemsak & Linsley, 1964
 Placoeme wappesi Galileo & Martins, 2010

References

Xystrocerini